Qi Junzao (July 11, 1793 – October 22, 1866) was a Chinese politician and calligrapher. Considered one of the "four great calligraphers" of the 1800s in China, he was also a prominent poet. He later became leader of the Grand Council of the Qing dynasty's imperial court.

Qi Juanzao was Han Chinese and had special influence in the Daoguang and Xianfeng eras. He was an exponent of the Song school of Chinese poetry.

Literature

References

Qing dynasty calligraphers
19th-century Chinese poets
Qing dynasty politicians
Grand Councillors of the Qing dynasty
Grand Secretaries of the Qing dynasty
Assistant Grand Secretaries
1793 births
1866 deaths
Royal tutors